Third Generation is the third studio album released by American jazz band Hiroshima, released in 1983 by Epic Records. The album hit #142 on Billboard 200.

Background
The album's title, "Third Generation", originated from band leader Dan Kuramoto's status as a "third generation" Japanese-American.

Reception

In regards to the album, Billboard wrote "the group defies labels, playing the spectrum from rock to AC, and playing it brilliantly" and concluded that the album "was well worth the wait". Meanwhile, AllMusic gave the album two stars out of five.

Track listing

Charts

References

1983 albums
Epic Records albums
Jazz-funk albums
Smooth jazz albums
Synth-pop albums by American artists